Ismaël Bangoura may refer to:
Ismaël Bangoura (born 1985), a Guinean football forward currently playing for Al-Batin F.C.
Ismaël Bangoura (Guinean footballer) (born 1985), a Guinean football forward currently playing for Team BMJC
Ismaël Karba Bangoura (born 1994),  a Guinean football left defender currently playing for Maceratese